BEND2 is a protein that in humans is encoded by the BEND2 gene. It is also found in other vertebrates, including mammals, birds, and reptiles. The expression of BEND2 in Homo sapiens is regulated and occurs at high levels in the skeletal muscle tissue of the male testis and in the bone marrow. The presence of the BEN domains in the BEND2 protein indicates that this protein may be involved in chromatin modification and regulation.

Gene

Common aliases 
BEND2 stands for BEN domain containing 2 and is also known as CXorf20 (HGNC ID: 28509).

Locus and size 
The locus for BEND2 is on the minus strand of the X chromosome at Xp22.13. The gene is approximately 58 kilobases in length.

mRNA

Alternative splicing 
BEND2 contains 14 exons which undergo alternative splicing to create five transcript variants that vary from 4,720 base pairs (bp) to 2,144 bp in the mature mRNA. The longest and most complete transcript of the gene, variant 1, encodes isoform 1 of the BEND2 protein (NP_699177.2).

5' and 3'UTR 
The untranslated regions (UTR) flanking the coding sequence of BEND2 at the 5' and 3' end of the mature mRNA molecule contain sites for RNA-binding proteins, including RBMX, pum2, and EIF4B as well as microRNA binding sites. The 5'UTR also contains an upstream in-frame stop codon and the 3'UTR contains a polyadenylation signal sequence.

Protein (Isoform 1)

Molecular weight and internal composition 
The predicted molecular weight is 87.9 kDal.

The predicted isoelectric point is pH 5.07.

The internal composition is enriched for serine residues.

Isoforms 
Corresponding to the five alternative transcripts of BEND2, the protein encoded by this gene is found in two isoforms (1 and 2) as well as three predicted structures (X1, X2, and X3). These isoforms range from 813 to 645 amino acids in length. Isoform 1 is 799 amino acids in length.

Subcellular location 
The presence of nuclear localization signals within the amino acid sequence or primary structure of the BEND2 protein leads to a prediction of subcellular localization in the nucleus. The pat7 [(P-X(1-3)-(3-4K/R)] signal and a nuclear bipartite signal are both found near the N-terminus of the protein.

Structure 
The secondary structure for BEND2 is unclear, in particular at the N-terminus, which is poorly conserved between orthologs. The C-terminus contains two BEN domains, which are predicted to form a series of alpha helices.

Post-translational modifications 
Based on its primary structure, BEND2 is predicted to undergo N-terminus acetylation, glycation of several lysine residues, SUMOlation, a SUMO interaction at the N-terminus, S-palmitoylation, and extensive phosphorylation.

Interacting Proteins 
BEND2 is found to interact with the following proteins through experimental yeast two-hybrid screens or pull down assays.

BEN Domains (protein feature) 
BEND2 has two BEN domains at its C-terminus. BEN domains are found in a diverse array of proteins and are predicted to be important for chromatin remodeling as well as for the recruitment of chromatin-modifying factors utilized during the process of transcriptional regulation of gene expression.  BEN domains are predicted to form four alpha helices that allow this domain to interact with its DNA target.

Dai et al. 2013 showed that the Drosophila melanogaster Insensitive (Insv) gene and corresponding protein has no domains of known chemical function yet it contains a single BEN domain. They illustrated the activity of the Insv protein in transcriptional regulation of genes and obtained a crystal structure of two Insv BEN domains interacting with their DNA target site.

Expression

Tissue expression pattern 
The expression of the BEND2 gene is regulated and it is therefore not ubiquitously expressed in the human body. High expression occurs in the testis and in the bone marrow. The NCBI EST profile for this gene shows expression only in the testis and in the muscle.

Transcriptional regulation of expression 
The promoter regulating expression of BEND2 (GXP_2567556) is 1255 base pairs in length and is located directly upstream of the BEND2 gene. It regulates transcription of all five transcriptional variants of BEND2. Genomatix's MatInspector program predicted 418 transcription factor binding sites within the BEND2 promoter, including for SRY, neurogenin, interferon regulatory factor-3 (IRF-3), Ikaros2, and TCF/LEF-1.

Homology

Paralogs 
The BEND2 protein has no known paralogs within the human genome.

BEN-domain containing gene family 
The BEND2 gene belongs to a family of human genes known as "BEN-domain containing”. This includes BANP (BEND1), BEND3, BEND4, BEND5, BEND6, BEND7, NACC1 (BEND8), and NACC2 (BEND9). The loci for these genes are spread throughout the human genome. Each of these genes contains between one and four BEN domains. Except for at these motifs, the genes of the BEN family do not have similar sequences.

Orthologs 
The BEND2 gene is conserved across evolutionary time as it has 114 known orthologs in a wide range of vertebrate species including mammals, birds, crocodilia, and amphibians. The BEND2 protein has 42 known orthologs. The C-terminus of the protein, the location of its BEN domains, is highly conserved; however, the N-terminus is not well conserved, even within the order of Primates.

Function 
BEND2 is predicted to be a DNA-binding protein due to the presence of BEN domains at its C-terminus, a hypothesis supported by its localization to the nucleus, the transcription factors found in its promoter region, and the nature of the proteins it interacts with. Though the precise function of the BEND2 protein is not yet well understood by the scientific community, BEN domains have been found to be important regulators of transcription.

Clinical significance 
The diseases that have been linked to BEND2 are related to the central nervous system though expression of the gene is not highly observed in these tissues. 
 BEND2 was identified as one of the genes that causes a central nervous system primitive neuroectodermal tumor when fused with the MN1 gene, which is located on chromosome 22.
 A rare primary central nervous system lymphoma tumor was found to have a high mutation ratio for BEND2; however, the authors do not describe this gene as primarily responsible for the tumor.
 A young girl diagnosed with severe epileptic encephalopathy was found to have a 300-kb deletion in a region that included BEND2, an extremely rare mutation not found in her parents’ genomes.
 An individual with adult autism was identified to have a copy-number variant of unknown significance in a region only containing BEND2.

References 

Genes on human chromosome X